Alan Hoffman may refer to:
Alan J. Hoffman (1924–2021), American mathematician
Alan L. Hoffman (born 1966), Chief of Staff to Vice President of United States and Deputy Assistant to President
America Hoffman, son of Abbie and Anita Hoffman who later took the name Alan
Guy Big (1946–1978), Canadian actor, born Alan Hoffman